Gadilinidae is a family of relatively large tusk shells, scaphopod mollusks in the order Dentaliida.

Genera
 Episiphon Pilsbry & Sharp, 1897
 Gadilina Foresti, 1895
 † Lobantale Cossmann, 1888

References

 Chistikov S. D. 1975. Some problems of scaphopod taxonomy [in Russian]: 18–21, in Likharev I.M. (ed.) Molliuski: ikh sistema, evoliutsiia i rol´v prirode, avtoreferaty dokladov, sbornik piatyi [Molluscs, their Systematic, Evolution and Significance in Nature], Akademiia Nauka, Leningrad.
 Scarabino V., 1995 Scaphopoda of the tropical Pacific and Indian Oceans, with description of 3 new genera and 42 new species P. Bouchet (ed) Résultats des Campagnes MUSORSTOM, Volume 14 Mémoires du Muséum National d'Histoire Naturelle, 167 189-379

External links
 Steiner, G.; Kabat, A. R. (2001). Catalogue of supraspecific taxa of Scaphopoda (Mollusca). Zoosystema. 23(3): 433-460

Scaphopods